Lower Dover is a Maya archaeological site in the Belize River Valley. It is located on the grounds of the Lower Dover Field Station & Jungle Lodge, in Unitedville, Cayo District, Belize. The site is bordered by the Belize River to the north, Upper Barton Creek to the west, Lower Barton Creek to the east, and the Western Highway to the south. Lower Dover is one of several Maya archaeological sites in the area; it is across the Belize River from (and south of) Barton Ramie, 3 kilometers west of Blackman Eddy, and 6 kilometers east of Baking Pot.

History 
The site of Lower Dover consists of a civic ceremonial center that was occupied in the latter part of the Late Classic, abandoned during the Terminal Classic, and partially reoccupied in the Early Postclassic; and a settlement area to the south that was occupied as early as the Middle Preclassic. Based on its location and the similarity of its architecture to that of the better-understood Maya archaeological site of Cahal Pech, it has been speculated that Lower Dover’s civic ceremonial center was an administrative seat for both the Lower Dover and Barton Ramie settlement areas, and a replacement in that role for Blackman Eddy, which was abandoned in the Late Classic. However, nothing is known for certain about the political status of Lower Dover, or about its relation to other sites. Much of the site remains unexcavated, and no dated or inscribed monuments have been discovered.

Excavations 
The site of Lower Dover was discovered by William and Madeline Reynolds, owners of the land and proprietors of the Lower Dover Field Station & Jungle Lodge, and brought to the attention of the Institute of Archaeology, National Institute of Culture and History (Belize), in 2009. The civic ceremonial center was first surveyed in 2009, and excavations have taken place there every year since 2010. The southern settlement area was first surveyed in 2013, and excavations have taken place there every year since 2014. All archaeological work at the site has been under the aegis of the Belize Valley Archaeological Reconnaissance Project (BVAR) and the direction of Dr. Jaime Awe, and excavations have been conducted by Rafael Guerra every year since 2011. In 2013, the entire site was surveyed via LiDAR ground-penetrating radar, as part of the West-Central Belize LiDAR Survey.

Ceramics 
Pottery types that have been identified at Lower Dover include Ahk’utu Molded-Carved, Alexander’s Unslipped, Augustine Red, Belize Red, Cayo Unslipped, Daylight Orange, Dos Arroyos Orange-Polychrome, Garbutt Creek Red, Miseria Appliqued, Mountain Pine Red, Paxcaman Red, Pedregal Modeled, Platon Punctated, Roaring Creek, Savanna Orange, and Tutu Camp Striated.

References

Further reading 
 Barillas, Derek. (2015). Lower Dover Excavation of Plaza B: Unit B14-1. In Julie A. Hoggarth and Jaime J. Awe, Eds., The Belize Valley Archaeological Reconnaissance Project: A Report of the 2014 Field Season, pp. 22–24. Institute of Archaeology, National Institute of Culture and History, Belmopan, Belize.
 Ebert, Claire E. (2015). Chemical Characterization of Obsidian Artifacts from Cahal Pech and Lower Dover, Belize. In Julie A. Hoggarth and Jaime J. Awe, Eds., The Belize Valley Archaeological Reconnaissance Project: A Report of the 2014 Field Season, pp. 210–221. Institute of Archaeology, National Institute of Culture and History, Belmopan, Belize.
 Guerra, Rafael. (2011). Preliminary Survey of the Lower Dover Maya Site, Unitedville Village, Cayo District, Belize. In Julie A. Hoggarth and Jaime J. Awe, Eds., The Belize Valley Archaeological Reconnaissance Project: A Report of the 2010 Field Season, pp. 1–6. Institute of Archaeology, National Institute of Culture and History, Belmopan, Belize.
 Guerra, Rafael A., and Shawn Morton. (2012). 2011 Survey at Lower Dover. In Julie A. Hoggarth, Rafael A. Guerra, and Jaime J. Awe, Eds., The Belize Valley Archaeological Reconnaissance Project: A Report of the 2011 Field Season, pp. 105–107. Institute of Archaeology, National Institute of Culture and History, Belmopan, Belize.
 Perkins, Carrie A. (2013). Excavations of Chultun LWDCH1, Lower Dover, Unitedville, Belize. In Julie A. Hoggarth, Reiko Ishihara-Brito, and Jaime J. Awe, Eds. The Belize Valley Archaeological Reconnaissance Project: A Report of the 2012 Field Season, pp. 247–257. Institute of Archaeology, National Institute of Culture and History, Belmopan, Belize.
 Perkins, Carrie A. (2014). Excavations of Chultun LWDCH2, Lower Dover, Unitedville, Belize. In Julie A. Hoggarth and Jaime J. Awe, Eds. The Belize Valley Archaeological Reconnaissance Project: A Report of the 2013 Field Season, pp. 201–211. Institute of Archaeology, National Institute of Culture and History, Belmopan, Belize.
 Rawski, Zoe J. (2015). 2014 Excavations at Plaza M, Lower Dover. In Julie A. Hoggarth and Jaime J. Awe, Eds., The Belize Valley Archaeological Reconnaissance Project: A Report of the 2014 Field Season, pp. 17–21. Institute of Archaeology, National Institute of Culture and History, Belmopan, Belize.
 Stanchly, Norbert. (2013). Preliminary Analysis of the Faunal Remains from Plaza F, Lower Dover, Belize. In Julie A. Hoggarth, Reiko Ishihara-Brito, and Jaime J. Awe, Eds. The Belize Valley Archaeological Reconnaissance Project: A Report of the 2012 Field Season, pp. 233–246. Institute of Archaeology, National Institute of Culture and History, Belmopan, Belize.
 Sullivan, Kelsey J., Julie Hoggarth, and Rafael Guerra. (2014). Site Core Lithic Analysis: A Comparison of Lithics from Baking Pot and Lower Dover in Cayo, Belize. In Julie A. Hoggarth and Jaime J. Awe, Eds. The Belize Valley Archaeological Reconnaissance Project: A Report of the 2013 Field Season, pp. 212–223. Institute of Archaeology, National Institute of Culture and History, Belmopan, Belize.

External links 
 Belize Valley Archaeological Reconnaissance Project (BVAR) www.bvar.org
 Institute of Archaeology, National Institute of Culture and History (Belize) www.nichbelize.org/ia-general/welcome-to-the-institute-of-archaeology.html
 Lower Dover Field Station & Jungle Lodge www.lowerdoverbelize.com

Maya sites in Belize
Maya sites
Cayo District